"Rocket Ride" is a song by the American hard rock band Kiss. It was originally featured on their 1977 album Alive II.

Background
"Rocket Ride" was written by Kiss guitarist Ace Frehley and Sean Delaney. Frehley sang lead vocals, and he noted in the booklet for the 2001 Kiss Box Set that this was his first vocal performance that he was satisfied with. It was the only studio track of the five recorded for Alive II that he performed on, as Bob Kulick was brought in to play guitar on some of the other tracks.

Like many of Kiss's works, the song is a double entendre, using space travel (appropriate to Frehley's onstage "Spaceman" persona) as an innuendo for sexual intercourse.

Hide recreated the intro of the song for his own 1998 single "Rocket Dive", the title also being an homage to the track. Frehley's 2008 tour, The Rocket Ride Tour (in support of his album Anomaly) was named after this song.

Personnel

Ace Frehley – lead & backing vocals, lead, rhythm & bass guitars
Peter Criss – drums

Reception
Cash Box said that it has "grinding heavy guitar and driving rock beat, flashy solo and competent vocals."

Rocket Ride peaked at No. 39 on the American Billboard Hot 100, making it the band's seventh US Top 40 hit.  The 45 was edited in time to 3:05.

References

Kiss (band) songs
Songs written by Ace Frehley
Casablanca Records singles
1977 singles
1977 songs